Timothey N'Guessan (born 18 September 1992) is a French handball player for FC Barcelona  and for the French national team.

He participated at the 2016 Summer Olympics in Rio de Janeiro, in the men's handball tournament.

References

External links

1992 births
Living people
French sportspeople of Ivorian descent
French male handball players
Olympic handball players of France
Handball players at the 2016 Summer Olympics
Handball players at the 2010 Summer Youth Olympics
Medalists at the 2016 Summer Olympics
Olympic silver medalists for France
Olympic medalists in handball
French expatriate sportspeople in Spain
FC Barcelona Handbol players
Liga ASOBAL players
Expatriate handball players
Handball players at the 2020 Summer Olympics
Medalists at the 2020 Summer Olympics
Olympic gold medalists for France